Terry Blair is the name of:

 Terry Blair (serial killer) (born 1961), American serial killer
 Terry Blair (politician) (1946–2014), member of the Ohio House of Representatives

See also
Terre Blair (born 1956), journalist and producer